Bid Kalmeh (also Romanized as Bīd Kalmeh and Bid Kelmeh) is a village in Oshtorinan Rural District, Oshtorinan District, Borujerd County, Lorestan Province, Iran. At the 2006 census, its population was 87, in 33 families.

References 

Towns and villages in Borujerd County